Sud Airlines was a charter airline based in Marseille, France.
It operated charter and vacation flights to Asia and the Caribbean. The airline ceased operations in July 2008.

Fleet
 1 McDonnell Douglas DC-10-30

References

External links
 Sud Airlines
 Photo of the company's aircraft at jetphotos.net

Defunct airlines of France
Airlines disestablished in 2008